Punjab Board of Investment & Trade (PBIT) is the trade and investment promotion agency in Punjab, Pakistan, working autonomously under the Industries, commerce, and investment department. It is a member of the Steering Committee and a Director for South Asia of the World Association of Investment Promotion Agencies (WAIPA).

Background 
Punjab Board of Investment & Trade (PBIT) was established in 2009 by Salmaan Taseer, the governor of Punjab. The first vice chairman and CEO was Haroon Khawaja. PBIT is a government-owned company that is run and managed by a Board of Directors (BOD) composed of members from the government and the private sector.

Areas of focus at PBIT 
 PROMOTION of Punjab as the ultimate destination for trade and investment, therein promoting a softer image of Punjab to the world and seeking new trade and investment leads;
 FACILITATION to ensure reduced time-to-market for the new entrants to Punjab’s market;
 SERVICING of the existing businesses, by redressing their grievances with the Government, thereby bridging the gap between the Private sector & the Government and also removing any impediments to their business growth in Punjab;
 POLICY ADVOCACY for the creation of a conducive business environment through proposals for amendments in existing legislation and proposals for fresh legislation.

The dynamic duo of public and private sector officials at PBIT is essentially to provide the businesses with a one-window facility for interaction with Government, thereby saving precious time and money. The sectors under focus for trade and investment at PBIT currently include:

 Agriculture along with Livestock & Dairy,
 Energy,
 Infrastructure and
 Manufacturing

In line with its focus areas of action and sectors, PBIT has managed to become a steering committee member and the Director of South Asia at WAIPA.

In its endeavour to put Punjab on the world map, PBIT has been conducting and participating in, global and local trade & investment events. A notable few in the year 2011-12 included; Halal Food Conference in collaboration with the Royal Thai Embassy in Pakistan; International Green Week, Berlin; Investment Conference Dubai, the 3rd World Investment Forum(WIF), Doha;,  Pak-Turk Business Forum; and Single Country Exhibition of Iran and Punjab Mango Festival.

PBIT has invited and hosted numerous delegations of Journalists from the USA and Germany and business delegations from a wide range of countries including Turkey, Spain, Italy, France, Canada, US, Korea, UAE, Japan, China, and Australia to promote a soft image of the country as well as expose the world to the untapped business opportunities in Punjab. PBIT has also serviced existing businesses in Punjab including local and multinational companies like Metro Cash and Carry, Coca-Cola, Telenor, Mobilink, General Electric, Zong Pakistan, Lotte Group, and Al-Futtaim Group, to name a few.

Various policy recommendations governing the Establishment of Special Economic Zones, Halal Certification, Public-Private Partnership Law, and Real Estates Investment Trust have also been advocated at both the provincial and federal tiers of government.

References

External links 
 
 Profile at Pakistan DMOZ 
 World Association of Investment Promotion Agencies official website

Government agencies of Punjab, Pakistan
Economy of Punjab, Pakistan
Investment companies of Pakistan
Investment promotion agencies